Bornargiolestes is a genus of flatwings in the damselfly suborder Zygoptera, family Rhipidolestidae.

Species
These three species belong to the genus Bornargiolestes:
 Bornargiolestes fuscus Dow, 2014
 Bornargiolestes nigra Kimmins, 1936
 Bornargiolestes reelsi Dow, 2014

References

Calopterygoidea
Zygoptera genera